Saravena is a city and municipality in Arauca Department, Colombia. The municipality, with a population of 55,554, has had FARC and ELN activity as well as a Colombian military presence near the Venezuelan border.

It is served by Los Colonizadores Airport.

Climate
Saravena has a tropical monsoon climate (Köppen Am) with moderate to little rainfall from December to March to and heavy to very heavy rainfall from April to November.

References

Municipalities of Arauca Department